Scopula vitiosaria is a moth of the family Geometridae first described by Charles Swinhoe in 1904. It is found in Kenya.

References

Endemic moths of Kenya
Moths described in 1904
vitiosaria
Moths of Africa